Cotapata National Park and Integrated Management Natural Area (Parque Nacional y Área Natural de Manejo Integrado Cotapata) is a protected area in the Yungas of La Paz Department, Bolivia.

The national park covers approximately 40% of the total area.

References

External links 
 Cotapata National Park and IMNA - Parkswatch Profile  
 English abstract of the research at Cotapata National Park and IMNA - Miguel Sevilla-Callejo's PhD - Universidad Autónoma de Madrid

National parks of Bolivia
Geography of La Paz Department (Bolivia)
Protected areas established in 1993
1993 establishments in Bolivia